Robyn Brooke Smith is a Jamaican writer and cartoonist based in the United States. She is the author of The Saddest, Angriest, Black Girl in Town and the illustrator of Wash Day, Nubia: Real One, and the forthcoming Wash Day Diaries.

Early life and education 
Smith was born and raised in Kingston, Jamaica. She aspired to become a cartoonist from childhood, inspired in part by her father, a portrait artist and her mother, a makeup artist. She also enjoyed reading Archie Digest. Smith's family immigrated to the Bronx when she was 16, after she graduated high school.

Smith received her bachelor's degree from Hampshire College and received her master of fine arts degree from the Center for Cartoon Studies.

Career 
During her graduate program at the Center for Cartoon Studies she developed her debut comic book The Saddest Angriest Black Girl In Town (2016) as a mini-thesis project, a memoir about "her experience being one of the only Black people in a rural Vermont town and how that time affected her mental health and her grasp of how Blackness is viewed in the world." The book was named to the 2016 Best Short Form Comics list by The Comics Journal. After going out of print, it was reprinted in 2021 by Black Josei Press. Smith also published comics on CollegeHumor.

Jamila Rowser approached Smith to illustrate Wash Day, a comic about a hair care ritual for Black women, published in 2018 after a successful Kickstarter campaign. It won a 2019 DiNKy Award for Best Floppy Comic. A follow-up called Wash Day Diaries will be released in June 2022.

Smith illustrated Nubia: Real One (2021), a DC comic written by L.L. McKinney.

Works

Illustration 
 2016 – The Saddest Angriest Black Girl In Town, writer and illustrator
 2018 – Wash Day, written by Jamila Rowser, Black Josei Press 
 2021 – Nubia: Real One, written by L.L. McKinney, DC Comics 
 2022 – Wash Day Diaries, written by Jamila Rowser, Chronicle Books

Accolades 
 2016 – Best Short Form Comics, The Comics Journal (for The Saddest Angriest Black Girl In Town)
 2021 – Emerging Talent Award, Cartoon Crossroads Columbus

References

External links 
 Official website

Year of birth missing (living people)
Living people
21st-century Jamaican women writers
Jamaican women artists
American women cartoonists
Writers from the Bronx
Jamaican illustrators
Hampshire College alumni
American people of Jamaican descent